St. Mary's Academy of San Nicolas, formerly known as Saint Nicholas Academy, is a Catholic private school in Cebu City, Philippines run and partially owned by the Religious of the Virgin Mary (RVM). The school has affiliation with the Archdiocesan Shrine of San Nicolas Parish. It offers Kindergarten, Grade School, and High School curricula for boys and girls.

See also
 Mother Ignacia del Espíritu Santo
 List of parishes in Cebu

References

External links
 

Catholic elementary schools in the Philippines
Catholic secondary schools in the Philippines
Schools in Cebu City
Religious of the Virgin Mary